Gagarin Nathaniel (born December 28, 1995) is an Indonesian competitive swimmer. He is currently first rank, holding two all-time records for 100 M & 200 M Men's Breaststroke in Indonesia (2017-present).   He is best known for his highest career achievement at SEA Games 2017, breaking the national record for 100 M Men's Breaststroke last made in 2009 by Indra Gunawan, and won Indonesia's first Gold Medal for that event since 1993 by Wirmandi Sugriat.

Swimming career 

Gagarin first broke the national record at the Jakabaring Aquatic Stadium in Palembang. He broke the record in the 200 M Men's Breaststroke with a time of 2:15:35. He broke the old record of 2:16:61. In the 2017 Islamic Solidarity Games (ISG) event, Gagarin also won a gold medal which took place at the Baku Aquatics Center in Azerbaijan. In the event, he managed to record the fastest time of 2 minutes 17.23 seconds.

In SEA Games 2017 held in National Aquatic Centre, Kuala Lumpur, Gagarin won his gold medal from 100m breaststroke, with a recorded a time of 1:01:76. While the second position was occupied by the Filipino swimmer, James Deiparine with a time of 1:02:11. While the third position was won by a Thai swimmer, Radomyos Matjiur with a time of 1:02:24. This also marked his second national record, which was last made in 2009 by Indra Gunawan, and marked Indonesia's first gold medal for that event since 1993 by Wirmandi Sugriat.

His latest big achievement was PON Papua XX held in Lukas Enembe Stadium, Jayapura, where he won four gold medals and broke four game records. Gagarin won gold for 50m, 100m and 200m breaststroke along with 4x100m men's medley. 

For 50m breaststroke, in the preliminary round of the morning session Gagarin also recorded a PON record of 28.50 seconds, previously held by Indra Gunawan 28.60 seconds in 2016 PON. In the final session, Gagarin sharpened it to 28.34 seconds. For 100 M Breaststroke, Gagarin won another gold medal with a record of 01:02:49, which also became a PON record, previously belonging to Indra Gunawan 01:02:57 at PON 2012. Lastly, for 200m breaststroke, Gagarin won gold medal with a recorded time of 2:17:82, breaking another game record by Indra Gunawan made in 2012 PON in Riau, which had lasted since the 2012 PON, 2:17:98.

Currently, Gagarin is placed first rank in Indonesia's men's breaststroke event, holding his all time national records.

References 

Indonesian swimmers
Competitors at the 2017 Southeast Asian Games

1995 births
Living people
Swimmers at the 2018 Asian Games